Live in Praha may refer to:

 Live in Praha, a 2010 live video of a 2009 Radiohead concert in Prague.
 Live in Praha (Iné Kafe video), 2009